The Wives Excuse also The Wives Excuse; Or, Cuckolds Make Themselves is a 1691 comedy play by the Anglo-Irish writer Thomas Southerne. The title is sometimes written more grammatically as The Wives' Excuse.

It was originally staged at the Theatre Royal, Drury Lane by the United Company with a cast that included Thomas Betterton as Lovemore, Edward Kynaston as Wellvile, Joseph Williams as Wilding, John Bowman as Courtall, William Mountfort as Friendall, George Bright as Ruffle, Joseph Harris as Musick Master, Elizabeth Barry as  Mrs Friendall, Anne Bracegirdle as Mrs Sightly, Susanna Mountfort as Mrs Wittwoud and Katherine Corey as Mrs Teazall.

References

Bibliography
 Van Lennep, W. The London Stage, 1660-1800: Volume One, 1660-1700. Southern Illinois University Press, 1960.

1691 plays
West End plays
Plays by Thomas Southerne
Restoration comedy